This is a list of films that were number one at the weekend box office in Mexico during 2008.

Highest-grossing films

Notes

 List of Mexican films — Mexican films by year

References
 Note: Click on the relevant weekend to view specifics.

2008
Box
Mexico